Sweden selected their entry for ESC 1977 in the show "Melodifestivalen 1977". The winner was the song "Beatles" by a group called Forbes. It was a tribute to the rock band The Beatles, who had split up some years earlier, and was written by Sven-Olof Bagge and Claes Bure.

Before Eurovision

Melodifestivalen 1977 
Melodifestivalen 1977 was the selection for the 17th song to represent Sweden at the Eurovision Song Contest. Sweden did not participate in the Eurovision Song Contest 1976 due to the potential expenses if Sweden had won the contest again and due to demonstrations against commercial music. It was the 16th time that this system of picking a song had been used. 965 songs were submitted to SVT for the competition. The final was held in the Cirkus in Stockholm on 26 February 1977, presented by Ulf Elfving and was broadcast on TV1 but was not broadcast on radio.

Voting

At Eurovision
The contest was held in London, and Forbes performed 12th. Sweden received 2 points from Germany and nothing else, giving them their first last place since 1963. To date, there has not been anymore.

Voting

References

External links
TV broadcastings at SVT's open archive

1977
Countries in the Eurovision Song Contest 1977
1977
Eurovision
Eurovision